Meet the Girls is a 1938 American comedy film directed by Eugene Forde and written by Marguerite Roberts. The film stars June Lang, Lynn Bari, Robert (Tex) Allen, Ruth Donnelly, Gene Lockhart and Wally Vernon. The film was released on October 7, 1938, by 20th Century Fox.

Plot

Cast      
June Lang as Judy Davis
Lynn Bari as Terry Wilson
Robert (Tex) Allen as Charles Tucker
Ruth Donnelly as Daisy Watson
Gene Lockhart as Homer Watson
Wally Vernon as Delbert Jones
Erik Rhodes as Maurice Leon
Constantine Romanoff as Tiny
Jack Norton as Fletcher
Emmett Vogan as Purser Brady
Paul McVey as First Mate Collins
Harlan Briggs as Ship's Captain

References

External links 
 

1938 films
20th Century Fox films
American comedy films
1938 comedy films
Films directed by Eugene Forde
American black-and-white films
1930s English-language films
1930s American films